Lithophasia is a genus of moths of the family Noctuidae.

Selected species
Lithophasia quadrivirgula (Mabille, 1888)
Lithophasia venosula Staudinger, 1892

References
Natural History Museum Lepidoptera genus database

Cuculliinae